A political drama can describe a play, film or TV program that has a political component, whether reflecting the author's political opinion, or describing a politician or series of political events.

Dramatists who have written political dramas include Aaron Sorkin, Robert Penn Warren, Sergei Eisenstein, Bertolt Brecht, Jean-Paul Sartre, Howard Brenton, Caryl Churchill, and Federico García Lorca.

Theatre
In the history of theatre, there is long tradition of performances addressing issues of current events, especially those central to society itself. The political satire performed by the comic poets at the theatres had considerable influence on public opinion in the Athenian democracy. Those earlier Western dramas, arising out of the polis, or democratic city-state of Greek society, were performed in amphitheaters, central arenas used for theatrical performances, religious ceremonies and political gatherings; these dramas had a ritualistic and social significance that enhanced the relevance of the political issues being examined.

Shakespeare is an author of political theatre according to some academic scholars, who observe that his history plays examine the machinations of personal drives and passions determining political activity and that many of the tragedies such as King Lear and Macbeth dramatize political leadership and complexity subterfuges of human beings driven by the lust for power. For example, they observe that class struggle in the Roman Republic is central to Coriolanus.

Historically in Soviet Russia, the term political theatre was sometimes referred to as agitprop theatre or simply agitprop, after the Soviet term agitprop.

Recent political drama

In later centuries, political theatre has sometimes taken a different form. Sometimes associated with cabaret and folk theatre, it has offered itself as a theatre 'of, by, and for the people'. In this guise, political theatre has developed within the civil societies under oppressive governments as a means of actual underground communication and the spreading of critical thought. Following the war there was an influx of political theatre, as people needed to discuss the losses of the war.

Often political theatre has been used to promote specific political theories or ideals, for example in the way agitprop theatre has been used to further Marxism and the development of communist sympathies.  Russian agitprop theater was noted for its cardboard characters of perfect virtue and complete evil, and its coarse ridicule.

Marxist theatre
But Marxist theatre wasn't always this directly agitational. Bertolt Brecht developed a highly elaborate and sophisticated new aesthetic—epic theater—to address the spectator in a more rational way. Brecht's aesthetics have influenced political playwrights throughout the world, especially in India and Africa. Augusto Boal developed the Brechtian form of Lehrstücke into  his internationally acclaimed Theatre of the Oppressed, with its techniques of 'forum theatre' and 'invisible theatre', to further social change. Boal's work in this area has contributed to the emergence of the Theatre for Development movement across the world. In the sixties playwrights like Peter Weiss adopted a more 'documentary' approach towards political theatre, following on from the example of Erwin Piscator in the twenties. Weiss wrote plays closely based on historical documents like the proceedings of the Auschwitz trial in Frankfurt.

Realism in theatre
Less radical versions of political theatre have become established within the mainstream modern repertory - such as the realist dramas of Arthur Miller (The Crucible and All My Sons), which probe the behavior of human beings as social and political animals.

Feminist theatre
A new form of political theatre emerged in the twentieth century with feminist authors like Elfriede Jelinek or Caryl Churchill, who often make use of the non-realistic techniques detailed above.. During the 1960s and 1970s, new theatres emerged addressing women's issues. These theatres went beyond producing feminist plays, but also sought to give women opportunities and work experience in all areas of theatrical production which had heretofore been dominated by men. In addition to playwright, producers, and actors, there were opportunities for women electricians, set designers, musical director, stage managers, etc.

Brechtian theatre
The Living Theatre, created by Judith Malina and her husband Julian Beck in 1947, which had its heyday in the 1960s, during the Vietnam War, is a primary example of politically oriented Brechtian performance art in the United States.  Their original productions of Kenneth Brown's The Brig (c. 1964), also filmed, and of Jack Gelber's controversial play The Connection and its 1961 film rely upon and illustrate the dramaturgy of Brechtian alienation effect (Verfremdungseffekt) that most political theatre uses to some extent, forcing the audience to take a "critical perspective" on events being dramatized or projected on screen(s) and building on aspects of the Theatre of Cruelty, which developed from the theory and practice of French early surrealist and proto-absurdist Antonin Artaud.

American regional theatre
In American regional theatre, a politically oriented social orientation occurs in Street theatre, such as that produced by the San Francisco Mime Troupe and ROiL.  The Detroit Repertory Theatre has been among those regional theaters at the forefront of political comedy, staging plays like Jacob M. Appel's Arborophilia, in which a lifelong Democrat prefers that her daughter fall in love with a poplar tree instead of a Republican activist. In 2014, Chicago's Annoyance Theater produced Good Morning Gitmo: a one-act play by Mishu Hilmy and Eric Simon which lampoons the US Detention Center at Guantanamo Bay.

English political theatre
Kitchen sink realism or kitchen sink drama was a movement that developed in the late 1950s and early 1960s in theatre, art, novels, film, and television plays, whose protagonists usually could be described as "angry young men" who were disillusioned with modern society. It used a style of social realism to depict the lives of working class Britons, and to explore controversial social and political issues ranging from abortion to homelessness. The film It Always Rains on Sunday (1947) is a precursor of the genre, and John Osborne's play Look Back in Anger (1956) is an example of an early play in this genre.

The Iraq War is the focus of some recent British political drama; for example, Stuff Happens, by David Hare.  David Edgar and Mark Ravenhill also satirize contemporary socio-political realities in their recent dramatic works.

Banner Theatre in Birmingham, England, in the United Kingdom, is an example of a specific kind of political theatre called Documentary theatre.

Scottish political theatre
John McGrath, founder of the Scottish popular theatre company 7:84, argued that "the theatre can never 'cause' a social change. It can articulate pressure towards one, help people celebrate their strengths and maybe build their self-confidence… Above all, it can be the way people find their voice, their solidarity and their collective determination."

Television
Television series that have been classified as political dramas include The West Wing, Borgen, Boss, Jack and Bobby, The Bold Ones: The Senator, Commander in Chief, House of Cards (UK and US versions), Madam Secretary, Designated Survivor, Spin, Ingobernable, Scandal, Billions, The Looming Tower, and The Mechanism.

The Good Wife can also be considered a political drama, especially in its critically acclaimed second season and fifth season. Races for political office, including state's attorney, governor, and even a Presidential run, move in and out of the show's narrative and the story of its main character, Alicia Florrick. However, Alicia's primary profession as a litigator for the most part takes precedence in the narrative, and so the show more often focuses on her cases and related office politics, making it primarily a legal drama.

Film
There have been notables films that have been labeled as political dramas such as Thirteen Days. A famous literary political drama which later made the transition to film was Robert Penn Warren's All the King's Men.

See also
Howard Brenton
Dario Fo
Jean Genet
Jerzy Grotowski (Art as Vehicle)
Harold Pinter
Erwin Piscator
Political thriller
Political cinema
Proletarian literature
Theatre state
Social criticism
Teatro Campesino

Notes

References

Bottaro, J. El Teatro Politico de Protesta Social en Venezuela, 1969-1979. Lewiston, New York: Edwin Mellen Press, 2008.
Broyles-Conzalez, Yolanda. El Teatro Campesino: Theater in the Chicano Movement.  Austin: U of Texas P, 1994.
Fischer-Lichte.  Theatre, Sacrifice, Ritual: Exploring Forms of Political Theatre. London: Routledge, 2005.
Filewod, Alan, and David Watt. Workers' Playtime: Theatre and the Labour Movement Since 1970.  Currency Press, 2001.
Godiwala, Dimple.  Breaking the Bounds : British Feminist Dramatists Writing in the Mainstream Since c. 1980.  New York: Peter Lang, 2003.
Jezer, Marty. "Abbie Hoffman: American Rebel" (p.xiv, Introduction). Rutgers University Press, New Brunswick, 1993  
Meier, Christian. The Political Art of Greek Tragedy.  Cambridge: Polity Press, 1993.
Patterson, Michael. Strategies of Political Theatre. Cambridge and New York: Cambridge UP, 2003.
Piscator, Erwin.  The Political Theatre: A History 1914-1929.  New York: Avon, 1978.
O'Corra, Simon, Taking the Medicine, A Play, Duality Books 2012 

 
Drama
Television genres